Ricardo Jorge Ferreira Pinto da Silva (born 19 August 1980), known simply as Ricardo, is a Cape Verdean former professional footballer who played as a central defender and a right-back.

Club career
Ricardo was born in Azurém, Guimarães, Portugal, and started playing football with amateurs Centro de Cultura e Desporto Desportivo de Ronfe and G.D. Serzedelo. In the following three years he competed in the third division, representing F.C. Famalicão (one season) and S.C. Freamunde (two).

In the summer of 2004, Ricardo moved straight to the Primeira Liga, signing with S.C. Beira-Mar. He featured in 29 games in his first season (24 starts), but suffered relegation; he continued to appear regularly for the Aveiro team during his spell, spending two years apiece in each of Portugal's major levels.

Ricardo returned to the top flight for 2008–09, joining F.C. Paços de Ferreira. In the following campaign's first round, he scored with his head to earn his side a point against FC Porto in a 1–1 home draw.

In June 2010, Ricardo signed with Vitória de Guimarães also of the top tier – he had been brought up as a youth at the Minho club. In January 2012, after a brief spell in China, he returned to Portugal and Paços on a three-and-a-half-year contract.

Ricardo retired at the end of 2019–20 aged 39, after one-season spells in the LigaPro with Famalicão and C.D. Feirense.

International career
Although born in Portugal, Ricardo opted to represent Cape Verde through ancestry. He received his first call-up in May 2008, first appearing on 27 May in a friendly with Luxembourg.

In June 2010, Ricardo started in the 0–0 draw that the minnows (ranked 117th) managed against Portugal, as the Europeans were preparing for that year's FIFA World Cup.

References

External links

1980 births
Living people
Sportspeople from Guimarães
Portuguese sportspeople of Cape Verdean descent
Cape Verdean footballers
Portuguese footballers
Association football defenders
Primeira Liga players
Liga Portugal 2 players
Segunda Divisão players
G.D. Serzedelo players
F.C. Famalicão players
S.C. Freamunde players
S.C. Beira-Mar players
F.C. Paços de Ferreira players
Vitória S.C. players
C.D. Feirense players
Chinese Super League players
Shandong Taishan F.C. players
Cape Verde international footballers
Cape Verdean expatriate footballers
Portuguese expatriate footballers
Expatriate footballers in China
Portuguese expatriate sportspeople in China